Critical path may refer to:
The longest series of sequential operations in a parallel computation; see analysis of parallel algorithms
Critical path method, an algorithm for scheduling a set of project activities
Critical path drag, a project management metric
Critical path network diagram, a network diagram highlighting the critical path
Critical Path (book), by Buckminster Fuller
The Critical Path: An Essay on the Social Context of Literary Criticism, a 1971 book by Northrop Frye
The Critical Path, a podcast by Horace Dediu
Critical Path (video game), an interactive movie computer game
Critical Path, Inc., a provider of messaging services
Critical Path Institute, an organization for improvement of the drug development process
Critical Path Project, a video archive
Critical Path Project, early source of HIV/AIDS information founded by Kiyoshi Kuromiya

See also
Critical graph, a graph where every vertex or edge is a critical element
Critical mass (disambiguation)
Critical point (disambiguation)